Hubert Simon Markl (17 August 1938 – 8 January 2015) was a German biologist who also served as president of the Max Planck Society from 1996 to 2002.

Early life
Markl was born on 17 August 1938 in Regensburg, Germany. He studied biology, chemistry and geography at the Ludwig Maximilian University of Munich. He completed his Ph.D. in zoology from the Ludwig Maximilian University of Munich in 1962. He did research internships at Harvard University and Rockefeller University in 1965–1966. In 1976, he earned his Habilitation (postdoctoral lecturing qualification) in zoology from the Johann Wolfgang Goethe University Frankfurt am Main.

Academic career and research
From 1968 to 1973, Markl worked as full professor and director of the Zoological Institute at the Darmstadt University of Technology. 
Since 1974, he has been Professor of Biology at the University of Konstanz.

From 1977 to 1983, he was vice president of the Deutsche Forschungsgemeinschaft (DFG) and from 1986 to 1991, he was president of the DFG. In 1993, he became president of the newly founded Berlin-Brandenburg Academy of Sciences and Humanities (Berlin-Brandenburgische Akademie der Wissenschaften). From 1996 to 2002, he was president of the Max Planck Society.

Markl was known for his work on sensory physiology, social behaviour of animals, nature conservation, and environmental protection. He has also published many books.

Awards and honors
Markl has received many awards and honors for his work.

He received the Lorenz Oken Medal from the Society of German Natural Scientists and Doctors in 1984, the Karl Vossler Prize in 1985, the Arthur Burkhardt Prize in 1989, the Karl Winnacker Prize in 1991, and the Ernst Robert Curtius Prize in 1995, the Bundesverdienstkreuz (officially Verdienstorden der Bundesrepublik Deutschland, Order of Merit of the Federal Republic of Germany) in 1992

He received honorary doctorates from Saarland University in 1992, and the University of Dublin in 1997. He received the Eduard Rhein Ring of Honor from the Eduard Rhein Foundation in 2004.

He was elected to the American Academy of Arts and Sciences in 1985, and the American Philosophical Society in 2000.
He was elected Foreign member of the Royal Society, in 2002. His nomination reads:

References

1938 births
2015 deaths
Academic staff of Technische Universität Darmstadt
20th-century German biologists
Knights Commander of the Order of Merit of the Federal Republic of Germany
Recipients of the Order of Merit of Baden-Württemberg
Ludwig Maximilian University of Munich alumni
Rockefeller University people
Max Planck Society people
Foreign Members of the Royal Society
Scientists from Regensburg
Members of the American Philosophical Society